The Convent of the Franciscan Conceptionists (Spanish: Convento de la Concepción Franciscana) is a Catholic convent of the Order of the Immaculate Conception, founded in 1484 by Saint Beatrice of Silva and located in Toledo, Spain. It is protected by the heritage listing Bien de Interés Cultural. The Chapel of Saint Jerome, which forms part of the complex, was first protected in 1884.

References

See also 

 List of Bien de Interés Cultural in the Province of Toledo

Bien de Interés Cultural landmarks in the City of Toledo
Convents in Spain